The Rock-afire Explosion was an animatronic character band that appeared in ShowBiz Pizza Place restaurants from 1980 to 1992. Since 1992, independent companies and people have been preserving it and one can still view the show in various locations around the world where it is still in operation to this day. The band's characters were various anthropomorphized animals, including a brown bear, a grey wolf and a silverback gorilla. They performed medleys of classic rock, pop, and country music, as well as original compositions and comedic skits.

The show was created and manufactured by inventor Aaron Fechter through his company Creative Engineering, Inc. in Orlando, Florida. In addition to overseeing the production of the animatronics, Fechter provided several of the characters' voices. When ShowBiz Pizza rebranded in 1992, the band was replaced by Chuck E. Cheese characters. The Rock-afire Explosion show was sold to other restaurants and entertainment centers such as Circus Pizza, Pistol Pete's Pizza, and Billy Bob's Wonderland.

The show was pioneering, in many respects, to other animatronics shows of the early 1980s. The life-sized characters were capable of facial expression, and some could even play simple melodies on musical instruments. At the end of the show's tenure, Chuck E. Cheese marketing director Jul Kamen credited Rock-afire with being largely responsible for Showbiz's success.

Technical specifications
The Rock-afire Explosion uses four recorded tracks, two for audio and two for data. The data tracks are encoded using Biphase mark code produced during the programming process by two Apple IIe computers. During the days when Showbiz was uninvolved in programming, the circuitry of the RAE was purchased by Creative Engineering from Superscope, the makers of Pianocorder.  Eventually, as technology evolved and Showbiz became involved in programming, they switched to a new programming system, APS (Animation Programming System), designed by Dave Philipsen. Cyberstar, a new controller designed by Bill Synhorst of Triad Productions, was implemented to add video playback capability, eliminating the need for the Pianocorder playback board and communicating directly with the existing driver boards.

Production

Production of the show's programming and audio was done in-house by Creative Engineering, Inc. in Orlando, Florida. Almost all Rock-afire shows were produced completely in-house, with Creative Engineering employees not only manufacturing the characters, but also writing and performing their songs and skits.

Later, as ShowBiz Pizza Place took over programming, they used Songcode, a system inherited from their acquisition of Pizza Time Theatre, until APS (see above) became their standard programming system.

Unlike other animatronic shows of the early 1980s, the Rock-afire Explosion was life-sized, with most of the performers about the size of an average adult human. Fechter also implemented latex masks for the characters' faces, as opposed to the rubber and Styrofoam masks common in other animatronics. The latex masks fit over movable parts on the characters' faces, permitting a range of facial expressions, including smiling and the raising of eyebrows. Fechter also implemented computer programming that permitted some of the characters to move in rhythm with music.

Band members
 Billy Bob Brockali –  Bass / Vocals. A brown bear from Tennessee who wore yellow and red overalls and played a wooden bass. He was the mascot for ShowBiz Pizza Place throughout its existence, and his image was on most of the chain's merchandise. Preceded by Billy Wilbur from the Hard Luck Bears and Bear Country Jubilee. Sweet and naive, Billy Bob was usually a mediator to the band's minor on-stage squabbles. Voice: Aaron Fechter
 Looney Bird – Vocals. Looney Bird shares Billy Bob's stage, as they are close friends. His head was the only thing ever seen, the rest of him hiding in an oil drum. Some shows featured a segment where Looney Bird would answer fan mail. For this, the robot was retrofitted to include a pair of hands that held a piece of paper for him to read. Looney Bird was originally portrayed as having the personality of an alcoholic and frequently huffed gas to calm himself down. In the mid 1980s, his personality underwent a drastic change and he would be portrayed as an inventor and scientific genius. Preceded by Gooney Bird from the Hard Luck Bears and Bear Country Jubilee. Voice: Aaron Fechter
 Dook LaRue – Drums / Vocals. A mongrel with a smooth singing voice who aspired space travel and wore a space themed suit. Slightly dimwitted, Dook would often lose focus during shows and miss his cues. Preceded by Dingo Starr from the Wolf Pack Five. Voice: Duke Chauppetta (1980-1994, 2016-present)
 Fatz Geronimo – Keyboards / Vocals. A silverback gorilla. He is a parody of real-life entertainers Fats Domino and Ray Charles. Unofficial band front man, Fatz had a tendency to ramble. He introduced the most shows and ordered other band members around, leading him and Rolfe DeWolfe into many arguments. Preceded by Fats from the Wolf Pack Five. Voice: Burt Wilson (1980-2006, 2020-present), Aaron Fechter (2006-2020)
 Beach Bear  – Guitar / Vocals. A polar bear with a laid back attitude and a smooth singing voice who was a surfer. He originally had a crazy personality. He is wise and somewhat sarcastic. Beach Bear was carried over from the Wolf Pack Five. Voice: Aaron Fechter (1980-1982), Rick Bailey (1982-present)
 Mitzi Mozzarella – Vocals. Mitzi was a mouse and a cheerleader. A typical teenager, Mitzi was considered "loose" by the rest of the Rock-afire Explosion, and was obsessed with gossip, boyfriends, pop music, and Michael Jackson. Preceded by Queenie Fox and Mini Mozzarella from the Wolf Pack Five. Voice: Aaron Fechter (1980-1982), Monique Danielle (1982), Shalisa James (1982-present)
 Rolfe DeWolfe and Earl Schmerle – A ventriloquist/comedy act. Nominally a stand-up comedy act performed in between musical sets; Rolfe is a wolf, and Earl is his sentient ventriloquist puppet. Rolfe is portrayed as sarcastic and abrasive, with a tendency to be incredibly rude to both the band and the employees that work at Showbiz. He has a fondness for disco music, Kmart, and the works of Frank Sinatra. Earl was there to "set him straight" by calling his behaviors out, and by turning Rolfe into a joke. Rolfe was preceded by the Wolfman from the Wolf Pack Five, while Earl is an original character. Voice: Aaron Fechter (for both Rolfe and Earl)

The show also has several smaller prop characters, many of which did not have speaking roles. These included an animated Sun and Moon (who provided background vocals from time to time), Antioch the birthday spider (who spoke in garbles), Choo-Choo the bear cub, who hid in a small tree stump in front of Dook's drums and "danced" to the band's music, and Birthday Bird, who sat on Billy Bob's guitar. On Dook's original stage, there was an owl that was just a prop, and did not move or speak. Additionally, thirty stores were outfitted with "Uncle Klunk" (voice: Jeff Howell), a human character who replaced Rolfe and hosted talk-show segments with his bird sidekick, Click. The Klunk animatronics also served to be retrofitted into Santa Claus shows during the holidays.

Later years at ShowBiz and Concept Unification
ShowBiz Pizza Place was similar to (and competed with) Chuck E. Cheese's Pizza Time Theatre, another animatronic restaurant chain that was popular in the United States. In the mid-1980s, both venues began to suffer financial difficulties, partially due to the video game crash of 1983 and also due to both companies having opened more restaurants than they could afford to maintain. When Pizza Time Theatre filed for bankruptcy in 1984, ShowBiz bought the company, hoping that new talent and merchandising opportunities could save both companies.

By 1985, Richard  M. Frank had joined the company as CEO and chairman. The corporation maintained the two restaurant chains simultaneously for several years. Each continued its own stage shows and sold different merchandise. However, in the latter part of the decade, relations between Creative Engineering and ShowBiz began to sour. Aaron Fechter, the founder of Creative Engineering and creator of the Rock-afire Explosion, claimed that the fallout between his company and ShowBiz arose when ShowBiz asked him to sign away the licensing and copyrights to the Rock-afire Explosion, which would have allowed ShowBiz to cut production costs on the show, such as manufacture of future shows and royalty payments to Creative Engineering. Fechter refused, on the grounds that ShowBiz offered no monetary compensation for the rights.

ShowBiz began toying with the idea of adding licensed characters such as Spider-Man or Garfield to the Rock-afire show, and three ShowBiz locations actually replaced Billy Bob and Looney Bird with Yogi Bear and Boo Boo animatronics in 1987.

An experiment of Paul Linden and Dave Philipsen using JVC BR-7000 VHS Hi-Fi tape decks which integrated two stereo audio tracks, two longitudinal data tracks, and video led to a system in 1988 where television screens were installed above the Rock-afire stage as the company introduced their new Cyberstar TV screen system. During showtime, the characters were finally shown performing in video, as reel-to-reel formatted tapes began to be used less often. A reel-to-reel version of Cyberstar called "Cybervision" was tested at two restaurants in Austin, TX; Cybervision can be distinguished from Cyberstar by the fact that they only feature the animatronics, and no graphics or walkaround characters. Cyberstar was also implemented at Pizza Time Theatre, and remains in use at all Chuck E. Cheese's locations, albeit using DVDs rather than VHS tapes.

The changes to the Rock-afire stage were very minor, as the company later decided to enact a process called "Concept Unification," in which all ShowBiz Pizza locations would be remodeled into Chuck E. Cheese's. The remodel included the elimination of all Rock-afire characters from merchandise and advertising, and retrofitting/reprogramming the Rock-afire Explosion animatronics into a show called Munch's Make Believe Band, featuring the Chuck E. Cheese's Pizza Time Theatre characters. Dook was moved to Billy Bob's place and became Pasqually P. Pieplate, Looney Bird became PizzaCam, Beach Bear became Jasper T. Jowls, Fatz became Mr. Munch, Mitzi was moved to Dook's place and became Helen Henny, The Sun became The Building, Choo-Choo became Munch Junior, and Rolfe became Chuck E. Cheese; The Moon was the only character carried over unchanged, and Antioch's computer and air lines were reused for The Wink, an animated Chuck E. Cheese head over the stage that would wink at the end of each segment. Unused animatronics (which included Billy Bob, Earl, and Antioch) and props were either sold off or destroyed.

After ties between Creative Engineering and ShowBiz were completely severed, "Concept Unification" began in November 1989 and occurred sporadically at ShowBiz locations for the next two years, with the final Rock-afire being converted at the Memphis location in January 1993. As Concept Unification began at each location, the right and center stages of the Rock-afire show were shut down, leaving only the Rolfe and Earl characters operational. The two performed "The Rolfe and Earle Show" (Earl's name was unintentionally misspelled), featuring the voices of Showbiz employees imitating Fechter's voice; the two ran a highlights reel of old Rock-afire Cyberstar segments and wondered aloud what the band would do now, and hinted at the coming Chuck E. Cheese-themed show. "The Rolfe and Earle Show" was the final Rock-afire show.

Current status
In the 1990s, an update to the band, known as "The New Rock-afire Explosion", was created, using new, smaller animatronics known as "mijjins", as well as other features such as revolving stages and dance choreography. However, relatively few customers purchased the show.

Fechter terminated all of his employees over several years, with the last 3 being terminated in 2003. In the mid 2000s, spurred by the growing online Rock-afire fan community, Fechter reunited some of the Rock-afire performers and began to program shows set to fan-requested songs. Videos of the performances—posted to his YouTube upon completion—are credited with helping to further revive interest in the group and ShowBiz Pizza, and spurred individuals who owned their own Rock-afire bands to begin programming new shows themselves.

Independent public shows in the United States
The Rock-afire Explosion performed at Rock-afire, an arcade bar in Kansas City, Missouri. However, the bar closed in February 2019.

Smitty's Super Service Station has a fully functional show in Sandy Hook, Mississippi.

The Rock-afire Explosion show at Billy Bob's Wonderland in Barboursville, West Virginia, remains operational and is now fully restored.

Although the Volo Auto Museum received a Rock-afire Explosion show and was expected to be put on exhibit in the summer of 2020, Fechter halted it due to their plans to use a third-party control system, similar to the Rock-afire Bar dispute.

Odyssey Fun World, an indoor amusement park located in Naperville, Illinois, and Tinley Park, Illinois, operated the New Rock-afire show in its restaurant.

Documentary
The Rock-afire Explosion, a documentary about Chris Thrash, Aaron Fechter and the remaining Rock-afire Explosion fan base, was released at film festivals and special screenings around the United States in the fall of 2008. It was released on DVD in 2009. In 2011, it was released on iTunes.

References

External links
Official documentary film site
http://showbizpizza.com/mobilehome.html
Where to see the Rock-Afire: https://where-to-see-the-rock-afire-explosion.jimdosite.com/

Fictional musical groups
Animated musical groups
Animatronic robots